Fraser Nihorya (died 23 February 2019) was a Malawian politician. He was deputy minister of finance in 2010.

References

Government ministers of Malawi
Year of birth missing
Place of birth missing
2019 deaths